Eurhinosaurus (Greek for 'well-nosed lizard'- eu meaning 'well or good', rhino meaning 'nose' and sauros meaning 'lizard') is an extinct genus of ichthyosaur from the Early Jurassic (Toarcian), ranging between 183 and 175 million years. Fossils of the aquatic reptile have been found in Western Europe (England, southern and northern Germany, the Benelux, France and Switzerland). They used to live in the deep, open sea area. Eurhinosaurus was a large genus of ichthyosaurs.

Eurhinosaurus followed the regular body morphology, with a fish-like fusiform body including well developed dorsal fin, hypocercal caudal fin, paired pectoral and pelvic fins, and remarkably large eyes. Like other ichthyosaurs, Eurhinosaurus did not have gills and used lungs for breathing. Eurhinosaurus had one distinct feature different from other ichthyosaurs: the upper jaw was twice as long as the lower jaw and covered with up and downwards-pointing teeth.

History and discovery 

The name Ichthyosaurus longirostris was first published by Mantell in 1851 in a guide to the paleontological galleries of the old British Museum, where one of the ichthyosaurian specimens was displayed as Ichthyosaurus longirostris. That specimen had exceedingly slender and elongated muzzle, but the skull was crushed. No characteristic preserved. The specific name, longirostris, was just affixed to the specimen. Since the features were so unclear, scientists at that time were not able to name this specimen. The first skull of Eurhinosaurus longirostris was found by Owen and Jaeger in Switzerland in 1856, which showed clearly shortened mandibles. The genus Eurhinosaurus was erected in 1909 in a paper describing the Miocene cetacean Eurhinodelphis cocheteuxi. Abel noted that it was not certain whether the cetacean's mandible extended to the tip of the snout or whether it was abbreviated, which was like the case in Ichthyosaurus longirostris in 1851. He considered that the weak, attenuated mandible and some other distinguishing features of Ichthyosaurus longirostris and decided to erect a separate genus and names as Eurhinosaurus. The type species by monotype, was Eurhinosaurus longirostris. In 2022, a second species, E. quenstedti was described from Germany. The original species, E. longirostris was considered dubious due to the poor preservation of the type specimen, with the species E. huenei, based on a complate skeleteon described in 1930 resurrected to replace it.

Description 

Eurhinosaurus was a large-bodied, small-toothed, slender ichthyosaur. The vertebral column was composed of roughly 50 precaudal, 45 tail stock and less than 100 fluke vertebrae.  The upper jaw was extremely long and lower jaw was weak but much shorter, which showed an extreme overbite, much as in the extant swordfish Xiphias. The upper jaw was more than twice as long as the lower jaw. The orbits of Eurhinosaurus were very large and directed anterolaterally. Their huge orbits were combined with an extremely short cheek region and reduced upper temporal openings. The external naris was large and retracted.

Eurhinosaurus had elongated, slender and straight teeth without distinct surface ornamentation of the crown.  Their teeth were delicate, sharply pointed and the enamel was smooth.  Their fenestra supratemporalis was small and external exposure of the frontal was strongly reduced. Like most post-Triassic ichthyosaurs, the parietal foramen was located on the connection point between parietal and frontal. The temporal fenestra was extremely small.

The supratemporal of Eurhinosaurus was very large and wide in the dorsal view, reaching the orbital margin. Its frontal was covered by nasals in the dorsal view. The prefrontal was very small and the postfrontal was large. Postorbital skull region was very narrow and the postorbital lacked of lamina posterior. Eurhinosaurus had the quadratojugal with long posteromedial processus quadratus and pierced by foramen of unknown function. Some small interpterygoid vacuities were found on the palate and it had short and wide pterygoid from the ventral view. Its parasphenoid endes anterolateral to the unpaired carotid foramen. The lower jaw of Eurhinosaurus had long processus retroarticularis. Atlas and axis abut very closely but were not completely fused together. No rib articulations were present on fluke vertebrae. Compared with Suevoleviathan and Temnodontosaurus, the fluke of Eurhinosaurus was relatively short. The caudal fin of Eurhinosaurus was in hypocercal shape (the notochord extended into the lower lobe) with cartilaginous chevrons which could be used for swimming in a high speed.

In the vertebral column, the neural spins of the dorsal vertebrae were remarkably short, less than the height of the centrum, which was also found in other lower Jurassic large-bodied ichthyosaur such as Temnodontosaurus and Platypterygius. The forefins of Eurhinosaurus offered a peculiarity: the radius was much larger than the ulna. Besides, the fins were very long and slender with four primary digits, no accessory digits and strong hyperphalangy. Their hindfins were about two thirds the length of forefins.

In the shoulder girdle, the interclavicle was small and T-shaped. The scapula was elongated with a narrow, expanded dorsal blade. The postglenoidal portion of the coracoid was larger than the much reduced anterior extension. The coracoid was rounded with a notch in the anterolateral margin. The humerus had a constricted, very thickened head and expanded, flattened distal end.

The pelvic girdle was moderately reduced and also showed the fusion of pubis and ilium seen Stenopterygius. The plate-like bones of the pelvis (pubis and ischium) had modified to the elongate and waisted bones. The pubis in this form lacked an obturator foramen.

Classification 

The cladogram below is based on Sander (2000), Maisch and Matzke (2000), Maisch (2010) and an analysis by Marek et al (2015).

Palaeobiology

Feeding mechanisms and diet 
The postcranial morphology of Eurhinosaurus was intermediate between those super fast swimmers and slower, more flexible predators. From their extreme overbite, they probably used a predatory strategy close to today's swordfish Xiphias. The elongated, densely toothed upper jaw was used as weapon to penetrate or make damage to small soft prey from the back. Eurhinosaurus belongs to the "Pierce I" predatory guild, so its dietary habits were consisted of small and soft, very delicate prey, such as small fishes, oysters and squids.

Swimming style and movement 
Like other ichthyosaurs, Eurhinosaurus was a high-speed swimmer. Eurhinosaurus used the lateral oscillation of their caudal fluke on a flexible tail stock for swimming. Eurhinosaurus had a slender fusiform body with long limbs and fluke.  Neural spines of fluke vertebrae were very short and almost erect. The relatively large hind limbs of Eurhinosaurus suggested their use in steering and probably propulsion at a very low speed. The swimming style of Eurhinosaurus was thunniform. Their hypocercal caudal fin, which was mounted on the narrow peduncle, moved through the water in a sinuous curve by the powerful muscles of the posterior trunk and the anterior tail region. From this motion, a strong force would be generated to pull Eurhinosaurus forward.

Like other ichthyosaurs, Eurhinosaurus probably was a deep diver. Eurhinosaurus had a very large orbit with sclerotic ring, a circular shaped bone that was embedded in their eye. The sclerotic ring was probably used to maintain the shape of their eyes against the high pressure in the deep sea while they were diving. Ichthyosaurs had the biggest eyes of any animal ever known. The big eye of Eurhinosaurus suggested that they had very good visual capacity, which helped them see clearly in the dark environment of the deep sea.

Palaeoenvironment 
Eurhinosaurus lived in open ocean, which was far away from the coastline. Eurhinosaurus was not like other ichthyosaurs and marine reptiles of the early Toarcian which showed a distinct provinciality. They had wide paleobiogeographic distribution in Western Europe. Fossils of Eurhinosaurus were found in the limestone and wackestone concretions in England, the Benelux, France, Switzerland and in southern and northern Germany. Limestone and wackestone were associated with the marine environment because of the aquatic formation process. Besides, the fossil of the Eurhinosaurus was found with some other ichthyosaurus or marine creatures such as ammonites. This was also the evidence could show Eurhinosaurus was a creature from the marine environment.

See also 
 List of ichthyosaurs
 Timeline of ichthyosaur research

References 

Early Jurassic ichthyosaurs
Ichthyosaurs of Europe
Jurassic animals of Europe
Toarcian life
Fossils of Germany
Fossils of England
Fossils of the Netherlands
Fossils of Switzerland
Fossil taxa described in 1851
Fossil taxa described in 1909
Ichthyosauromorph genera